Rocket Mortgage FieldHouse is a multi-purpose arena in Cleveland, Ohio. The building is the home of the Cleveland Cavaliers of the National Basketball Association (NBA) and the Cleveland Monsters of the American Hockey League (AHL). It also serves as a secondary arena for Cleveland State Vikings men's and women's basketball.

Rocket Mortgage FieldHouse opened in October 1994 as part of the Gateway Sports and Entertainment Complex with adjacent Progressive Field, which opened in April of that year. The facility replaced the Richfield Coliseum as the primary entertainment facility for the region and the home of the Cavaliers, and supplanted the Wolstein Center at Cleveland State University, which opened in 1991, as the primary concert and athletic venue in downtown Cleveland. From its opening in October 1994 until August 2005, it was known as Gund Arena, named for former Cavaliers owner Gordon Gund, after he paid for the naming rights. After purchasing a majority of the Cavaliers in March 2005, Dan Gilbert bought the naming rights in August 2005 and renamed the building Quicken Loans Arena after his mortgage lending company Quicken Loans. It was renamed in April 2019 for Quicken Loans' online mortgage lending service, Rocket Mortgage, as part of the facility's renovation and expansion.

Rocket Mortgage FieldHouse seats 19,432 people in its basketball configuration and up to 18,926 for ice hockey. It is a frequent site for concerts and other athletic events such as the men's and women's basketball tournaments of the Mid-American Conference (MAC), hosting the men's tournament since 2000 and the women's tournament since 2001. It has also been the host venue for the 2007 NCAA women's Division I basketball Final Four, opening and regional semi-final games in the NCAA Division I men's basketball tournament, the U.S. Figure Skating Championships in 2000 and 2009, and the 2016 Republican National Convention.

History

Rocket Mortgage FieldHouse was preceded in downtown Cleveland by the Cleveland Arena, a facility built in 1937 with a seating capacity for basketball of approximately 12,000. It was best known as the site of the Moondog Coronation Ball in 1952, widely regarded as the first rock and roll concert. Cleveland Arena was the first home of the Cavaliers in 1970.

The Cleveland Arena was also the home of an earlier professional basketball team, the Cleveland Rebels of the Basketball Association of America, the original Cleveland Barons ice hockey team, and hosted several games of the Cincinnati Royals of the NBA in the 1960s. By 1970, however, Cleveland Arena was outdated and in disrepair. The Cavs played there their first four seasons. It was replaced in 1974 by the 20,273-seat Richfield Coliseum, located in Richfield, between Cleveland and Akron.

During the 1980s, the site of the Central Market, a fruit and vegetable market that dated back to 1856, was selected for construction of a multi-purpose domed stadium for the Cleveland Browns and Cleveland Indians, but the ballot measure to fund it was defeated by voters. The market site was acquired in 1985 and cleared in 1987 in a continued push for new downtown sports facilities by city and business leaders. In 1990, voters approved a sin tax on alcohol and tobacco products in Cuyahoga County to fund the Gateway Sports and Entertainment Complex, which includes the FieldHouse and adjacent Progressive Field. Construction began in 1992 with the ballpark opening in April 1994 and the arena in October 1994. The arena opened with a concert by Billy Joel on October 17, 1994. The Cavaliers played their first regular-season game in the arena a few weeks later, a loss to the Houston Rockets on November 8, 1994.

As part of his purchase of the team and the arena naming rights in 2005, Dan Gilbert, owner of Quicken Loans, funded renovations of the arena, which included installing new wine-colored seats, state-of-the-art scoreboards, video systems, and sound systems, new arena graphics and signage, and upgrades to security, locker rooms, and the suites, all of which were in place for the start of the Cavaliers' 2005–2006 season, except for the seats, which were replaced a few sections at a time.

Gilbert purchased the then-inactive Utah Grizzlies franchise of the American Hockey League on May 16, 2006, and announced that it would move to Quicken Loans Arena to replace the departed Cleveland Barons. The team name was announced as the Lake Erie Monsters on January 25, 2007, and began play in the 2007–08 season. The Lake Erie Monsters changed their name to the Cleveland Monsters on August 9, 2016.

The Las Vegas Gladiators of the Arena Football League announced on October 16, 2007, that they would move to Quicken Loans Arena, becoming the Cleveland Gladiators.

In December 2016, the Cavaliers announced plans for renovations to the arena that included an increase in the square footage of the concourses and open areas, along with upgrades throughout the building. The plan, which relied partly on tax money for funding, faced opposition from activist groups including the Cuyahoga County Progressive Caucus and the Greater Cleveland Congregations (GCC). After the groups submitted signatures to force a referendum on the plan, the Cavaliers announced that they were withdrawing from the plan, citing rising costs and delays caused by the prospective referendum. However, in August 2017, after Cuyahoga County made a non-binding commitment to build two mental health crisis centers, the GCC withdrew its petitions. In December 2017, the team stated it was moving forward with the renovations. The project will cost $193 million, after interest, with taxes paying for $100 million of it.

Design and operations
The arena seats 19,432 for basketball, with 2,000 club seats and 88 luxury suites. Seating is divided into three levels, with two main levels of suites and five "platinum suites" on the event level.  Around the seating there are two main concourses, one on the ground level to access the 100 level seating and 32 lower suites, and an upper concourse for the top 200 level seating. The lower concourse also includes the ticket office and the two-level main team shop. In between is the club level, which provides access to the 60 upper suites and club seating. Also on the club level is an auxiliary gym, which was used by the Cavaliers as their main practice court until the opening of the Cleveland Clinic Courts practice facility in 2007.

In the hockey and arena football configuration, capacity is 18,926. During most Monsters games, the upper-level seating is closed and covered by a large curtain, reducing capacity to 9,447. In the basketball configuration, when the upper-level seating is closed, capacity is listed at 11,751. 60% of the seating is located in the lower two levels. The seating capacity was reduced in 2018 as part of a major renovation project that expanded the concourses, removed three sections of seating in the upper level, and updated other parts of the facility. From the opening of the arena until 2018, seating capacity for basketball was listed at 20,562, with a maximum for ice hockey and arena football at 20,056.

The main scoreboard at Rocket Mortgage FieldHouse, nicknamed Humongotron, is the fourth largest scoreboard used in an NBA arena. It was installed in October 2014,

The sign was approved by the Cleveland City Planning Commission in March 2016 with the stipulation that only the arena's name or its naming rights sponsor can be shown. Any other use of the sign needs commission approval.

The arena, along with neighboring Progressive Field and an adjacent parking garage, is owned by the Gateway Economic Development Corporation of Greater Cleveland, an entity made up of members appointed by the governments of the city of Cleveland and Cuyahoga County. Gateway leases the arena to the Cavaliers, who also manage the Cleveland Monsters.
 
In March 2017, in partnership with the non-profit organization KultureCity, the Cavaliers officially introduced the availability of accommodations during all events for guests with hypersensitivity needs, such as attendees with autism spectrum disorders. This includes staff training, free "sensory bags" with headphones, a blanket, and other items geared towards attendees with sensory needs, as well as a sensory room and exemptions from re-entry policies if they are overwhelmed by the environment. The arena became the first in the NBA to be certified by KultureCity as being "sensory inclusive".

Tenants

Current
As the home of the Cavaliers and Monsters, Rocket Mortgage FieldHouse has hosted a number of notable events for each team, including playoff and championship games. Through the 2020–2021 season, the Cavs have hosted playoff games in 12 of their 27 seasons at Rocket Mortgage FieldHouse, including games three and four of the 2007 NBA Finals, 2017 Finals, 2018 Finals and games three, four, and six of the 2015 and 2016 Finals. The arena was also the site of the 1997 NBA All-Star Game, which celebrated the 50th anniversary of the founding of the NBA, and it also hosted the 2022 All-Star Game, honoring the league's 75th anniversary.

The Monsters made their playoff debut in 2011 and returned to the playoffs in 2016. In the 2016 Calder Cup playoffs, the team advanced to the Calder Cup final and swept the Hershey Bears in four games for their first Calder Cup in franchise history. Games three and four were held at Rocket Mortgage FieldHouse. Game four, held on June 11, was a sell-out and drew 19,665 fans, which set a record for largest crowd to ever see a professional hockey game in the state of Ohio and the second-largest postseason crowd in American Hockey League history.

Former
Rocket Mortgage FieldHouse has been home to other franchises that have either relocated or folded. When it opened in 1994, in addition to being home of the Cavaliers, it was also the home arena for the Cleveland Lumberjacks of the International Hockey League (IHL). The Lumberjacks played at the arena until 2001, when the team folded along with the IHL. Later that year, a new incarnation of the Cleveland Barons, who played in the American Hockey League, began play and were tenants at the arena until 2006 when the team moved to Worcester, Massachusetts.

The Cleveland Gladiators of the Arena Football League qualified for the playoffs in six of their nine seasons in Cleveland and hosted playoff games in 2008, 2011, and 2014. During the 2014 season, the team finished 15–1 overall and advanced to ArenaBowl XXVII, which was held at Rocket Mortgage FieldHouse. The game drew 18,410 fans and was held at the same time as a Cleveland Browns home preseason game at FirstEnergy Stadium, and a Cleveland Indians home game at adjacent Progressive Field.

Two women's professional teams have also called the arena home. From 1997 to 2003, the Cleveland Rockers, one of the eight charter members of the Women's National Basketball Association (WNBA), played at Rocket Mortgage FieldHouse. The team folded after the 2003 WNBA season because the Gunds, who still owned the Cavs at that point, no longer wished to operate the Rockers franchise, and a new ownership group could not be obtained. The Cleveland Crush of the Lingerie Football League played at Rocket Mortgage FieldHouse for their 2011–12 and 2012–13 seasons before moving to Toledo, Ohio, in late 2013.

Events

College sports
In addition to its professional sports tenants, Rocket Mortgage FieldHouse has hosted several intercollegiate sporting events. It has been home to the Mid-American Conference (MAC) men's basketball tournament since 2000 and the MAC MAC women's basketball tournament since 2001.  "MAC Madness," as it is known, has become a strong draw for the arena.  The men's semi-final and championship games routinely draw 10,000–15,000 attendees. In addition, the Rocket Mortgage FieldHouse has served as a host for games of the NCAA Men's Division I Basketball Championship, hosting early-round games in 2011 and regional semi-final and final games in 2015. Rocket Mortgage FieldHouse has also hosted games for the NCAA Women's Division I Basketball Championship, hosting regional semi-finals and finals for the 2006 tournament and the Final Four and national championship game of the 2007 tournament.

In 2015, it was announced that arena management and Cleveland State University came to an agreement where select Cleveland State Vikings men's and women's basketball games would take place at Rocket Mortgage FieldHouse, while the arena would essentially take over operations of the Wolstein Center, CSU's primary home arena, being in charge of promoting and booking events at the venue.

WWE
The arena has hosted numerous WWE professional wrestling cards, including pay–per–view events such as:

SummerSlam (1996) – headlined by Shawn Michaels vs. Vader for the WWF Championship
No Mercy (1999) –  headlined by Triple H vs. Stone Cold Steve Austin for the WWF Championship
Invasion (2001) – headlined by Team Alliance vs. Team WWF.
Survivor Series (2004) – headlined by Team Orton vs. Team Triple H
Unforgiven (2008) – headlined by the World Heavyweight Championship Scramble match.
TLC: Tables, Ladders and Chairs (2014) – headlined by Bray Wyatt vs. Dean Ambrose in a TLC match.
Fastlane (2016) – headlined by Brock Lesnar vs. Roman Reigns vs. Dean Ambrose in a Triple Threat match for the No. 1 contender for the WWE World Heavyweight Championship at WrestleMania 32.
Fastlane (2019) – headlined by The Shield vs. Baron Corbin, Drew McIntyre and Bobby Lashley

Boxing
On August 29, 2021, Cleveland native and internet personality turned professional boxer Jake Paul took on former UFC Welterweight Champion Tyron Woodley in an 8-round professional boxing match. Paul won the eight round bout via split decision in front of a nearly sold-out Rocket Mortgage Fieldhouse.

Other events
Rocket Mortgage FieldHouse was selected in July 2014 as the host site for the 2016 Republican National Convention. The arena hosted the first Republican presidential debate of the 2016 election, aired by Fox News Channel, on August 6, 2015. The convention was held July 18–21, 2016. Records obtained by the Center for Public Integrity show that Comcast, Microsoft, the American Petroleum Institute, Chevron, Koch Companies Public Sector, PhRMA, and other trade and lobby groups, "funded a limited liability company called 'Friends of the House 2016 LLC' to pay for "the design and outfitting of an exclusive office, lounge and gathering space, called the 'cloakroom', for Republican lawmakers" on the Cleveland Cavaliers practice court Quicken Loans Arena. The Cleveland 2016 Host Committee, who "facilitated construction of the 'cloakroom" space', received $923,100 from the Friends of the House 2016 LLC."

References

External links

 
 Quicken Loans Arena Seating Chart

1994 establishments in Ohio
Basketball venues in Ohio
Cleveland Barons (2001–2006)
Cleveland Cavaliers venues
Cleveland Gladiators
Cleveland Monsters
Cleveland Rockers venues
College basketball venues in the United States
Event venues established in 1994
Indoor ice hockey venues in Ohio

National Basketball Association venues
Sports venues in Cleveland
Music venues in Cleveland
Sports venues completed in 1994
Indoor arenas in Ohio
Rock Ventures
Downtown Cleveland